Pussy Tourette is the stage name for an American drag queen, composer and singer.

She is best known for her single "French Bitch", for which a music video/short film directed by Andrei Rozen was made and included in the film festival compilation DVD Boys' Shorts: The New Queer Cinema. The song is a comedic, high camp dance track about the duplicitous title character who "stole my man, 'cause she felt the need to scratch an itch". There is a mild lyrical suggestion that the subject has had an overseas sex-change operation, though this must be inferred by the listener. The chorus is sung in Franglish and contains the wordplay, "Je suis oh-so-hot! Vous-voulez my twat, s'il vous plait?". The song was remixed for club play and was well-received in gay venues.

Discography

Albums
 In Hi-Fi! (1993)
 Who Does She Think She Is? (1995)
 ep1 (2007)

Singles
 "French Bitch" (1993)
 "Heels" (1993)
 "Bracelets" (1993)
 "If I Can't Sell It" (1993)
 "Kiss" / "All My Misery" (1995)
 "Outta My House" (1998)
 "Brand New Day" (2005)

Television and film 
 Cabaret U-Mano – Soundtrack composer (2006)
 Slap Her, She's French – Soundtrack composer (2002)
 G String Divas – Soundtrack Composer (2000)
 Men In Shorts 2 – Herself (2000)
 La Cage aux Zombies – Soundtrack composer (1995)
 HBO's Real Sex – Soundtrack composer (1994)
 Sex Is... – Soundtrack composer (1993)

References

External links
 Official MySpace Profile
 
 Pussy Tourette – New York Times listing

American drag queens
American dance musicians
Living people
Year of birth missing (living people)
Place of birth missing (living people)
American gay musicians